Steven James Braun (November 13, 1959 – November 18, 2022) was an American businessman and politician from the state of Indiana. A member of the Republican Party, he served in the Indiana House of Representatives from 2012 to 2014.

Background
In 1990, Braun founded Braun Technology Group which was later renamed to Braun Consulting. In 2004, he sold it to Fair Isaac Group.

Braun was the former Commissioner of the Indiana Department of Workforce Development. Then-Governor Mike Pence appointed Braun in 2014. In 2017, Braun resigned as Commissioner. He ran unsuccessfully for Indiana's 4th congressional district in 2018. The seat was held by Todd Rokita who ran unsuccessfully for U.S. Senate, against Braun's brother, Mike, in the Republican primary.

It was reported in August 2019 that Braun had officially entered the race for the seat being vacated by Susan Brooks in Indiana's 5th congressional district. He ultimately withdrew after suspending his campaign due to health issues. Republican nominee Victoria Spartz won the seat and took office on January 3, 2021.

Braun and his wife had five children. He died of cancer on November 18, 2022, at the age of 63.

References

External links
Steve Braun at Ballotpedia

1959 births
2022 deaths 
Deaths from cancer in Indiana
Harvard University alumni
Republican Party members of the Indiana House of Representatives
People from Jasper, Indiana
People from Zionsville, Indiana
Braun family of Indiana
21st-century American politicians